Jesús Tamayo Tapia (born 17 July 1994) is a Spanish professional footballer who plays mainly as a left winger for CD Numancia.

Football career
A product of AD Alcorcón's youth system, Tamayo made his senior debuts in the 2012–13 season with the reserves, in the Tercera División. On 27 October 2013 he made his first appearance with the main squad, playing the last 5 minutes of a 0–0 home draw against Girona FC in the Segunda División.

On 13 July 2014 Tamayo rescinded his link with the Madrid outfit and moved to another reserve team, Elche CF Ilicitano. The following 22 January, after appearing sparingly, Tamayo returned to Alcorcón B, on loan until June, and signed permanently for the club on 28 July.

On 21 January 2017, Tamayo joined Getafe CF and was assigned to the B-team also in division four. He subsequently represented Segunda División B sides Internacional de Madrid and CF Rayo Majadahonda, scoring nine goals with the former.

On 24 August 2020, Tamayo agreed to a two-year deal with CF Fuenlabrada in the second division. On 24 September, after being offered to move out on loan, he terminated his contract with the club, and moved to CD Numancia just hours later.

References

External links

1994 births
Living people
Footballers from Madrid
Spanish footballers
Association football forwards
Segunda División players
Segunda División B players
Tercera División players
AD Alcorcón B players
Elche CF Ilicitano footballers
Getafe CF B players
Internacional de Madrid players
CF Rayo Majadahonda players
CF Fuenlabrada footballers
CD Numancia players